Albania competed in the 2022 Winter Olympics in Beijing, China, from 4 to 20 February 2022.

Albania's team consisted of one male alpine skier. As Albania's only athlete, Denni Xhepa was also the country's flagbearer during the opening ceremony. Xhepa was accompanied by six officials and coaches. A volunteer served as the flagbearer during the closing ceremony.

Competitors
The following is the list of number of competitors who participated at the Games per sport/discipline.

Alpine skiing

By meeting the basic qualification standards, Albania qualified one male alpine skier. Denni Xhepa, an Italian born skier of Albanian origin, represented the country.

References

Nations at the 2022 Winter Olympics
2022
Winter Olympics